Plughead Rewired: Circuitry Man II is a 1994 American post-apocalyptic science fiction film written and directed by Steven Lovy and Robert Lovy, and starring Jim Metzler, Vernon Wells, Deborah Shelton, Dennis Christopher, Nicholas Worth and Traci Lords. It is the sequel to the 1990 cult classic movie Circuitry Man.

Synopsis 
In the backdrop of Earth's polluted future, a female FBI agent removes Danner, a pleasure android from an asylum to coerce him into helping her hunt down the criminal psychopath "Plughead". But Plughead, who has tangled with Danner before, has his own plans. He is forcing a female scientist to help him manufacture life extending longevity chips, which he intends to sell to rich and powerful clients.

Cast 
 Vernon Wells as "Plughead"
 Deborah Shelton as Kyle
 Jim Metzler as Danner
 Dennis Christopher as "Leech"
 Nicholas Worth as "Rock"
 Traci Lords as Norma
 Paul Willson as "Beany"
 Andy Goldberg as "Squid"
 Tom Kenny as "Guru"
 George Murdock as Senator Riley
 Bill Bolender as Private Richards
 George Buck Flower as Jerry
 Gigi Gaston as Rider

Reception 
Writing in Entertainment Weekly, J. R. Taylor rated it C− and wrote that the film recycles the plot from the first film, though he praised Metzler as "one of the more interesting genre guys around".  Michael Weldon, author of The Psychotronic Video Guide, called it "an almost plotless, sometimes funny comedy sequel".

References

External links 
 

1994 films
1994 independent films
1990s science fiction action films
American independent films
American sequel films
Cyberpunk films
American post-apocalyptic films
American robot films
American science fiction action films
I.R.S. Media films
1990s English-language films
1990s American films